Ferid Idrizović (born September 10, 1982) is a Bosnian-Herzegovinian former footballer who played in the Premier League of Bosnia and Herzegovina, Malaysia Premier League, Albanian Superliga, Montenegrin First League, and the Canadian Soccer League.

Club career 
Born in Montenegro, Idrizović began his career in 1998 with FK Sarajevo in the Premier League of Bosnia and Herzegovina. Where he played in the 2002–03 UEFA Cup against Beşiktaş J.K. In 2005, he went overseas to Brunei to play in the Malaysia Premier League. Later that year, he returned to Bosnia to play with NK Posušje, then he was transferred to KF Teuta Durrës of the Albanian Superliga. After his tenure in Albania he returned to Bosnia to play with Sarajevo, NK Žepče, NK Kreševo-Stanić, and NK Travnik. In 2009, he went abroad to play in the Montenegrin First League with FK Dečić, and FK Rudar Pljevlja. During his stint with Rudar Pljevlja he played in the 2010–11 UEFA Champions League against Litex Lovech. In 2011, he went overseas to Canada to play with Brantford Galaxy in the Canadian Soccer League. At the conclusion of the CSL season he returned to Montenegro to play and retire with FK Berane.

References 

1982 births
Living people
People from Bijelo Polje
Bosniaks of Montenegro
Bosnia and Herzegovina people of Montenegrin descent
Association football midfielders
Bosnia and Herzegovina footballers
FK Sarajevo players
HŠK Posušje players
KF Teuta Durrës players
NK Žepče players
NK Travnik players
FK Dečić players
FK Rudar Pljevlja players
Brantford Galaxy players
FK Berane players
Premier League of Bosnia and Herzegovina players
Kategoria Superiore players
First League of the Federation of Bosnia and Herzegovina players
Montenegrin First League players
Canadian Soccer League (1998–present) players
Montenegrin Second League players
Bosnia and Herzegovina expatriate footballers
Expatriate footballers in Brunei
Expatriate footballers in Albania
Bosnia and Herzegovina expatriate sportspeople in Albania
Expatriate soccer players in Canada
Bosnia and Herzegovina expatriate sportspeople in Canada